Nirmal Puwar is a senior lecturer at the department of Sociology at Goldsmiths University and Co-Director of Methods Lab. She is a member of the Feminist Review editorial collective since 2000. Puwar has co-edited 17 Collections, including: Post-colonial Bourdieu; Orientalism and Fashion; Intimacy in Research; Live Methods and, South Asian Women in the Diaspora.

Puwar has written about and researches postcolonialism; institutions, race and gender & critical methodologies and has written two books; Space Invaders: race, gender and bodies out of place (2004), in which she argues that that diversity is about perceptions of whiteness rather than how whiteness operates, and Fashion and Orientalism (2003). In 2007, she directed the film Coventry Ritz which emphasizes "the haunting remnants of emptied out architecture and unused space."

References

External links 
 Nirmal Puwar. Staff Page. Goldsmith University 
 Twitter

Year of birth missing (living people)
Living people
People associated with Goldsmiths, University of London
Feminist theorists
Feminist studies scholars
Feminist writers